Regimbartia is a small genus of beetles belonging to the family Hydrophilidae comprising ten species distributed throughout Africa, South Asia, South East Asia and Australia.

Species
 Regimbartia attenuata (Fabricius, 1801)
 Regimbartia compressa (Boheman, 1851)
 Regimbartia condicta Orchymont, 1941
 Regimbartia denticulata (Mulsant, 1853)
 Regimbartia elliptica (Régimbart, 1906)
 Regimbartia inflata (Brullé, 1835)
 Regimbartia minima Orchymont, 1941
 Regimbartia nilotica (Sharp, 1904)
 Regimbartia obsoleta (Régimbart, 1906)
 Regimbartia sumatrensis Orchymont, 1941

References

 

Hydrophilidae genera